Neil Moss may refer to:

 Neil Moss (caver), victim of a famous caving accident in Derbyshire, England
 Neil Moss (footballer), footballer for AFC Bournemouth